Charlo Airport  is located  south-southeast of Charlo, New Brunswick, Canada.

The airport is classified as an airport of entry by Nav Canada and is staffed by the Canada Border Services Agency (CBSA). CBSA officers at this airport can handle general aviation aircraft only, with no more than 15 passengers.

History
Charlo Airport, the only airport in the region, offered scheduled air service from 1963 to 2001. In October 2012, Provincial Airlines began trial flights at the Charlo Airport. In January 2013, because there was sufficient demand, it made the trial flights permanent. It provides direct flights between Charlo and Wabush, Labrador and Halifax, Nova Scotia.

Airlines and destinations

References

External links
 Official site
 Provincial Airlines
Page about this airport on COPA's Places to Fly airport directory

Certified airports in New Brunswick
Transport in Restigouche County, New Brunswick
Buildings and structures in Restigouche County, New Brunswick